Georg Hermann Nicolai (10 January 1812 – 10 July 1881) was a German architect and educator, Professor of Architecture at the Royal Academy of Fine Arts on the Brühl Terrace in Dresden from 1850 until his death.

Life 
Nicolai was born at Torgau, in the Kingdom of Saxony.  He studied architecture at the Dresden Academy with Bernhard Schreiber under Joseph Thürmer and later in Munich under Friedrich von Gärtner. Travels to Italy included stints in 1834-5 and 1839-40. He served as Hofbaumeister in Coburg from 1841–45 and established a private practice in Frankfurt am Main from 1845-48. In mid-summer 1850 he succeeded Gottfried Semper as Professor of the Bauatelier of the Dresden Academy of Fine Arts many months after Semper had participated in building a barricade in the May Uprising of the previous year. Nicolai brought a fine sensibility to the reinterpretation of Quattrocento-style Neorenaissance architecture in Dresden in his years at the Academy, and was an extremely popular teacher. Many of his students went on to distinguished careers in Saxony and beyond. He died at died Bodenbach (Elbe), aged 69.  Upon his death, his former pupil Constantin Lipsius (1832-1894) was named his replacement.

Principal Works
Seebach Residence (1839)
Villa Struve (1851-2)
Villa Meyer (1867–69)
Reconstruction of Prince George's Palace on the Zinzendorfstrasse (1855-7)
Villa Seiler (1867-8)

All of these were destroyed during the Allied bombing of Dresden in World War II.

References

English
Berry, J. Duncan. The Legacy of Gottfried Semper: Studies in Späthistorismus (Ph. D. Diss., Brown University, 1989): .

German
Anon., Geschichte des akademischen Architekten-Club Akanthus. Gedenk-Schrift zum 30jährigen Stiftungsfeste 1894 (Dresden 1894).
Anon., "Herrmann Georg (sic) Nicolai," Dresdner Anzeiger CLI/229 (August 17, 1881): .
Helas, Volker. Sempers Dresden. Die Bauten und die Schüler (Dresden, 2003): , 47 n9. 
Lier, H. A. in Allgemeine Deutsche Biographie 52 (1906): .
Lipsius, Constantin. "Georg Hermann Nicolai," Deutsche Bauzeitung 16 (1882): , 314-7.
Milde, Kurt. Neorenaissance in der deutschen Architektur des 19. Jahrhunderts. Grundlagen, Wesen und Gültigkeit (Dresden 1981): , 225, 260.
Neiss, A. (ed.), Architektonischen Entwürfe aus dem Atelier des Prof. Hermann Nicolai in Dresden. 2nd ed. (Berlin, n. d., [ca. 1883]).
Nicolai, Georg Hermann. Das Ornament der italienischen Kunst des 15. Jahrhunderts. Eine Sammlung der hervorragendsten Motive (Dresden, 1882). Engl. trans. as: The Ornament of Italian Art of the XV. Century. A Collection of Superior Specimens (New York, 1914).

1812 births
1881 deaths
People from Torgau
People from the Kingdom of Saxony
19th-century German architects
Academic staff of the Dresden Academy of Fine Arts